Royal Naval Air Station Dale or more simply as RNAS Dale is a former Fleet Air Arm base located  west of Milford Haven, Pembrokeshire, Wales.

History

RAF Dale

Construction of the airfield began between the villages of Dale and Marloes in 1941. It became operational in June 1942. Initially it was to be named RAF Marloes, planned as a satellite to nearby RAF Talbenny, but the name was changed to RAF Dale instead. The only RAF unit to use RAF Dale was No. 304 Polish Bomber Squadron between 30 December 1942 and 2 April 1943 using the Vickers Wellington IC.

RNAS Dale

Following cessation of activities in the Second World War, RAF Dale was decommissioned, and the site became occupied by the Fleet Air Arm as RNAS Dale (HMS Goldcrest), a satellite of HMS Goldcrest at RNAS Brawdy.

The following squadrons were posted to RNAS Dale at some point:
 748 Naval Air Squadron
 762 Naval Air Squadron
 784 Naval Air Squadron
 790 Naval Air Squadron
 794 Naval Air Squadron
 809 Naval Air Squadron
 861 Naval Air Squadron
 897 Naval Air Squadron
 1770 Naval Air Squadron
 Coastal Command Development Unit RAF

Current use

Now owned privately by a local farmer, in May 2010, an illegal rave was held on the site, attracting 2,500 people. Dyfed-Powys Police were forced eventually to create road blocks to stop further attendees joining, and release an announcement on local media. After the rave ended on Monday 31 May, six men aged between 23 and 52 were charged with offences under Section 136 of the Licensing Act for carrying out unlicensed licensable activity.

See also
 List of air stations of the Royal Navy
 List of former Royal Air Force stations

References

Citations

Bibliography

D